Vriesea cearensis is a species in the genus Vriesea. This species is endemic to Brazil.

References

cearensis
Flora of Brazil